City Safety is an auto brake technology that assists in reducing or avoiding traffic accidents at speeds up to  in vehicles using City Safety Generation I. Later models using City Safety Generation II can stop at . All cars sold by Volvo Cars with a Model Year of 2014 or later is equipped with City Safety Generation II, with an exception of the XC90 (2002-2014). City Safety is made by Volvo Cars.
 The Volvo V40 was the first car to make use of City Safety Generation II when it was released 2012, and since then other cars in the line up has gotten the same system. It uses lidar laser sensor that monitors an area approximately  directly in front of the vehicle. The feature is programmed to respond if the car in front is either at a standstill or is moving more slowly in the same direction as the car itself. If City Safety determines a collision is unavoidable and the driver does not respond, it activates the vehicle's brakes and switches off the throttle. Keep in mind that these values only applies to City Safety Generation I. 

The system has several factors that should be kept in mind.

When City Safety applies the brakes, the brake lights are flashing rapidly to inform drivers behind about emergency braking.
In cases where City Safety has stopped the vehicle, it will then release the brakes after about 2 seconds and the driver must apply the brakes to keep the vehicle at a standstill. 
It is always on at start-up and can be deactivated in the "Car Setting" menu. 
It does not respond to oncoming traffic. 
The driver can override City Safety by aggressively steering, accelerating, or braking.
City Safety's performance is not affected by darkness or light, but may be affected by weather conditions such as heavy rain, fog, or snow.
The windshield needs to be clean and should remain free of any flags or decals.
The driver is always responsible for controlling the vehicle and should never rely solely on the City Safety auto brake feature.
Under normal driving condition, the feature is transparent to the driver and there are no settings to change.
City Safety may help drivers avoid rear-end collisions and prevent whiplash injuries to passengers in the car ahead, as well.
City Safety may reduce the cost of ownership due to reduced insurance rates and lower repair costs.

References

External links
"Safety > Preventing accidents > Our preventive safety systems > City Safety"
"S60 MY 13 HIGHLIGHTS > SAFETY AND SECURITY LEADERSHIP > PREVENTIVE SAFETY > CITY SAFETY"
"Volvo S60 City Safety review"
"High-tech system on Volvos is preventing crashes"

Volvo Cars
Automotive safety